Nerio Nesi (born 16 June 1925) is an Italian politician, businessman and banker.

Biography
Born into a working-class family of Corticella, a district of Bologna (his father was a worker and the mother a housewife), Nesi participated in the partisan resistance and then graduated in law. Profoundly Catholic, his first political experience was in the Christian Democracy, but a choice was not linked to ideological reasons but by the conformist spirit, since in his city, the Italian Communist Party had 58% of the vote, while the DC trudged to 12% approximately.

A friend of Enrico Berlinguer, he participated with him to a mission in the USSR and was expelled for this shield crusader. Despite the excellent relations he had with Belinguer he chose not to join the PCI. He entered instead in the Italian Socialist Party, in the current driven by Riccardo Lombardi, the leftmost deployed.

He became a banker by accident in 1967 when he was appointed vice president of Cassa di Risparmio di Torino after that several Socialist leaders refused the job. Shortly after he created the office Credit and Insurance of PSI (of which he was chief from 1977 to 1978) and continued his climb unabated: it was actually president of the Banca Nazionale del Lavoro (BNL) in the Eighties and until the fall of Berlin Wall, he worked as a business journalist at the RAI in Turin and as an engineer at the Olivetti.

Despite its economic situation now very wealthy, he wanted to stay in politics, always on the side of the left and it was this dubbed the "Red banker". His relations with Bettino Craxi were not always positive and when in 1994 the PSI was gone, Nesi decided to join the Communist Refoundation Party with which he was elected in 1996. In 1998, however, broke away from the party of Fausto Bertinotti, as opposed to the distrust that the PRC gave to Romano Prodi and joined the Party of Italian Communists. From 2000 to 2001 he served as Minister of Public Works in the Amato II Cabinet.

In 2001 he ran for the Chamber in Liguria and won the seat thanks to the assistance granted by the center-left Olive Tree coalition. On 15 April 2004 came out of the Italian Communists and joined the group of the Italian Democratic Socialists with whom participated in the project of socialist unity. He was Vice President of "Commission Environment, Land and Public Works" in the XIV legislature.

References

Living people
1925 births
Communist Refoundation Party politicians
Italian partisans